Juno Mak (born 18 March 1984) is a Hong Kong singer, record producer, actor, and director. He made his musical debut in 2002 with the EP On the Road. His albums have won Best Record three times at the Ultimate Song Chart Awards Presentation. 

He made his directorial debut with the horror film Rigor Mortis in 2013.

Career

Music
Mak began his music career as a pop singer with Universal Music. Two albums, On the Road and Next Step, were released with Universal Music. Both albums reached the top spot on TVB. Although he won awards upon his debut, it was later rumoured that his fans were hired professional groupies earning up to HKD150 an hour, and in 2002 he was booed by audience members during an awards ceremony. 

Mak's 2015 EP Addendum spawned the number one singles "Unforgettable" (念念不忘), "Imperfection" (瑕疵), and the award-winning duet "Rashōmon" (羅生門), a duet with Kay Tse.

Film
In 2010, Mak wrote and starred in Wong Ching-po's film Revenge: A Love Story. The film was a hybrid of slasher and love story. Mak and Wong Ching-po collaborated again in 2011 on the film Let's Go!.

In 2013, Mak directed the film Rigor Mortis, which pays tribute to the 1980s Jiangshi genre. In 2015, it was announced Mak would direct the crime thriller Sons of the Neon Night.

Anti-graft investigation
In 2003, Mak, his father, and a number of music executives from TVB and Universal Music HK were arrested as part of an investigation into an alleged bribes-for-awards scam. The case was eventually withdrawn with no charges made.

Personal life
Mak is the second son of Clement Mak, the chairman of CCT Fortis Holdings Limited.

Discography 
On The Road (2002)
Next Step (2003)
Proto (2004) 
Otherside (2005)
Walking Underneath (New + Best Selection) (2005) 
Chapel Of Dawn (2007)
Words Of Silence (2008)
Why (2008)
The Dream (天生地夢) (2009) 
Nothing Lasts Forever (New + Best Selection) (2010)
No-mind (無念) (2011)
Paradoxically, Yours (柔弱的角) (2014)
Addendum (2015) 
Evil Is a Point of View (2016)
The Album Part One (with Kay Tse; 2018)
The Album and the Rest Of It (with Kay Tse; 2019)

Filmography 
2003 – Truth or Dare: 6th Floor Rear Flat
2010 – Dream Home
2010 – Revenge: A Love Story
2011 – Let's Go!
2013 – Rigor Mortis (Nominated – Golden Horse Award for Best New Director)
2019 – Sons of the Neon Night

References

1984 births
Living people
Hong Kong male singers
Hong Kong male television actors
Cantopop singers
21st-century Hong Kong male actors
Hong Kong film directors
Hong Kong film producers
Hong Kong screenwriters
Hong Kong male film actors